Richard Angst (23 July 1905 – 24 July 1984) was a Swiss cinematographer who worked on more than ninety films during his career, most of them in Germany. Angst emerged as a leading photographer of mountain films during the silent era. He often worked with the director Arnold Fanck, and accompanied him in 1937 for The New Earth his troubled 1937 co-production with Japan. While he worked on some Nazi propaganda films such as My Life for Ireland, many of the films he was employed on during the era were less political.

After the Second World War, he worked regularly in German commercial cinema often at CCC Film. He was the cinematographer for Fritz Lang's The Indian Tomb and The Tiger of Eschnapur (both 1959).

Selected filmography
 Milak, the Greenland Hunter  (1928)
 The White Hell of Pitz Palu (1929)
 Two People (1930)
 White Ecstasy (1931)
 S.O.S. Iceberg (1933)
 The Burning Secret (1933)
 White Majesty (1934)
 Forbidden Territory (1934)
 North Pole, Ahoy (1934)
 The Champion of Pontresina (1934) 
 Demon of the Himalayas (1935)
 Kleine Scheidegg (1937)
 The Vulture Wally (1940)
 My Life for Ireland (1941)
 Rembrandt (1942)
 Melody of a Great City (1943)
 Gabriele Dambrone (1943)
 Melusine (1944)
 Earth (1947)
 Ulli and Marei (1948)
 A Kingdom For a Horse (1949)
 The White Hell of Pitz Palu (1950)
 Fanfares of Love (1951)
 Storm Over Tibet (1952)
 Father Needs a Wife (1952)
 Cuba Cabana (1952)
 Hit Parade (1953)
 Hocuspocus (1953)
 The First Kiss (1954)
 Three Men in the Snow (1955)
 The Last Man (1955)
 I Often Think of Piroschka (1955)
 The Spessart Inn (1958)
 La Paloma (1959)
 Peter Shoots Down the Bird (1959)
 The Good Soldier Schweik (1960)
 The Strange Countess (1961)
 Ramona (1961)
 Via Mala (1961)
 Sherlock Holmes and the Deadly Necklace (1962)
 Axel Munthe, The Doctor of San Michele (1962)
 The Black Abbot (1963)
 Breakfast in Bed (1963)
 The Phantom of Soho (1964)
 The Seventh Victim (1964)
 The Dirty Game (1965)
 A Holiday with Piroschka (1965)
 Praetorius (1965)
 Liselotte of the Palatinate (1966)
 The Wedding Trip (1969)

References

Bibliography
 High, Peter B. The Imperial Screen: Japanese Film Culture in the Fifteen Years' War, 1931-1945.  University of Wisconsin Press, 2003. 
 Reimer, Robert C. & Reimer, Carol J. The A to Z of German Cinema. Rowman & Littlefield, 2010.

External links

1905 births
1984 deaths
Swiss cinematographers
Film people from Zürich